Stöckli railway station is a railway station in the municipality of St. Stephan, in the Swiss canton of Bern. It is an intermediate stop on the  Montreux–Lenk im Simmental line of the Montreux Oberland Bernois Railway.

Services 
The following services stop at Stöckli:

References

External links 
 
 

Railway stations in the canton of Bern
Montreux Oberland Bernois Railway stations